A Liber beneficiorum ("Book of Benefice") is a register (table of, inventory) concerning beneficials, benefactors, properties and privileges. Excerpt from such a book was accepted by civil courts as a righteous evidence during property disputes.

The oldest known Polish register of this kind is the  liber beneficiorum dioecesis Cracoviensis (book of benefice of the diocese of Krakow) by Jan Długosz from 1470–1480. Similar register has been made by Jan Łaski.

External links 
 Liber beneficiorum dioecesis Cracoviensis Vol. 1, Jan Długosz (in Latin)
 Liber beneficiorum dioecesis Cracoviensis Vol. 2, Jan Długosz (in Latin)

See also 
 Benefice

Bibliography 
 Liber beneficiorum (w:) Encyklopedia WIEM
 Liber beneficiorum (w:) W. Kopaliński, Słownik wyrazów obcych i zwrotów obcojęzycznych
 Z. Gloger, Księga rzeczy polskich, Lwów 1896, s. 215

Accounting journals and ledgers